Wockia asperipunctella is a species of moth, belonging to the genus Wockia.

It is native to Europe and Northern America.

References

External links

Urodidae